Sadaf Malaterre (born 3 April 1969) is a Pakistani fashion designer who has been running her eponymous label in Karachi, Pakistan, since 2005.

Career
She went to Saint Joseph's College for Women, Karachi. In the early part of her career she modeled for brands and fashion magazines in Pakistan. As a designer, she is known for her bright colors and innovative techniques. Malaterre is also known for using local embroidery techniques to create modern textures.

In 2011, Malaterre appointed a marketing consultancy in Pakistan to look after her business affairs and communication.

Accreditation
The designer is registered with the Pakistan Fashion Design Council and has shown her collections at all PFDC Sunsilk Fashion Weeks since 2009. She also showed two collections with the now defunct Fashion Pakistan Week.

References 

Pakistani fashion designers
Pakistani women fashion designers
People from Karachi
Pakistani people of French descent
Living people
1975 births